Matelita Buadromo (born 15 January 1996) is a Fijian swimmer.

Buadromo hails from the islands of Moala and Rotuma. She has competed internationally since she was eleven and won a bronze medal at the 2012 Oceania Swimming Championships in the 200m freestyle event. 

Buadromo was selected to represent Fiji at the 2012 Summer Olympics.  She is an all-rounder competitor but specializes in the 100 and 200 metre breaststroke. She turned pro when she competed in the 2011 Pacific Games in New Caledonia.

References

External links

Fijian female swimmers
1996 births
Olympic swimmers of Fiji
Swimmers at the 2012 Summer Olympics
Swimmers at the 2016 Summer Olympics
Commonwealth Games competitors for Fiji
Swimmers at the 2014 Commonwealth Games
Swimmers at the 2018 Commonwealth Games
Living people
Fijian people of Rotuman descent
Sportspeople from Suva
I-Taukei Fijian people